Enchelyurus kraussii, Krauss' blenny, is a species of combtooth blenny found in coral reefs in the western Pacific and Indian Oceans.  This species grows to a length of  SL. The specific name honours the German scientist, traveller and collector Christian Ferdinand Friedrich Krauss (1812-1890).

References

kraussii
Fish described in 1871
Taxa named by Carl Benjamin Klunzinger